Darju (also romanized as Darjū; also known as Dar Joveh, Dar Jovū, Darjūreh, and Darjūveh) is a village in Bakhtegan Rural District, Abadeh Tashk District, Neyriz County, Fars Province, Iran. At the 2006 census, its population was 212, in 48 families.

References 

Populated places in Abadeh Tashk County